Charles Joseph "Chuck" Chvala (born December 5, 1954) is an American real estate dealer, lawyer, and former politician.  He served 20 years in the Wisconsin State Senate, representing Dane County, and was the Democratic leader from 1995 through 2002.  His political career was ended by a 2002 scandal which found he and other lawmakers had illegally utilized state employees for campaign work.

Early life
Born in Merrill, Wisconsin, Chvala's family moved to Madison where he attended La Follette High School, and served as a student member of the Madison School Board.  He earned his bachelor's degree in political science from the University of Wisconsin–Madison in 1978 and the same year earned his J.D. from the University of Wisconsin Law School.

Career
Both of Chvala's parents were teachers in the Madison School District, and famously led a strike in the 1970s.  His parents' involvement with the teachers' union was a springboard for his entrance into politics.  He made his first run for Wisconsin State Assembly in 1978, relying on union support in the Democratic primary.  He ultimately fell 174 votes short of David Travis, another first time candidate who would also go on to become a Democratic caucus leader in the 1990s.

Between 1978 and 1982, Chvala worked as a lawyer and legislative consultant in Madison.  His clients included the Wisconsin Pharmaceutical Association and the Citizens Utility Board.  He also served the boards of the non-profit organizations Vets House and The Attic.

Legislative career

Following the court-ordered redistricting of 1982, Chvala ran in the newly drawn 98th Assembly district.  Due to the drastic redistricting, there was no incumbent in the district.  Chvala prevailed over a field of five Democrats in the primary, and went on to receive 70% of the vote in the general election.

In 1983, the Legislature passed another redistricting plan, superseding the court-ordered plan.  Chvala chose to run for Wisconsin State Senate in 1984, in the redrawn 16th Senate district, which now stretched from Madison's east side through eastern Dane County, western Rock County, and across Green County.  This time, Chvala faced no opposition in the Democratic primary, but had a more competitive general election, receiving 54% of the vote over Republican Thomas L. Storm.  He was subsequently re-elected four times, serving until 2005.

Gubernatorial campaign

In 1994, Chvala sought to challenge incumbent Republican Governor Tommy Thompson.  Chvala faced no opposition in the Democratic primary, but lost to Thompson in a landslide, receiving only 31% of the statewide vote.

Senate leadership

From 1995 to 2002 he led Senate Democrats during a time of razor-thin, one-vote party balances, leading to flips between Democratic and Republican leadership control. For example, Chvala was majority leader in early 1998, but in April Republican Mary Lazich won a special election to replace Democratic Sen. Lynn Adelman, who had been appointed to the federal bench, which flipped control of the 17-16 chamber to Republicans, making Chvala minority leader. A few months later, Democrats won in the fall elections by a one-seat margin, flipping control back in January 1999, making Chvala majority leader again.

In the fall of 2002, Chvala and other legislative leaders were ensnared in a scandal arising from the use of state legislative staffers and resources for political campaign duties.  He was charged with 20 felony counts, including extortion, misconduct in public office, and filing false election reports. He pleaded guilty to two counts, and was sentenced to nine months in jail with two years of probation.

After the legislature

While on probation, Chvala became involved in the real estate market in collaboration with his daughter, who was a licensed broker.  His law license, which had been suspended following his guilty plea, was reinstated in 2008, enabling him to resume his legal practice.  He also serves as a regular contributor to The Insiders, a political commentary series in Wisconsin.

Personal life and family
Chvala married Tracyjean Rebenstorff in June 1978.  They had two children together before divorcing in 1988.

Chvala subsequently married Barbara Worcester, a Senate legislative staffer, in 1991.  Worcester continued her career in government after Chvala's resignation and served for many years as chief of staff to Democratic Senate leader Russ Decker.  She now works as deputy chief of staff to Governor Tony Evers.

Electoral history

Wisconsin Assembly (1978, 1982)

| colspan="6" style="text-align:center;background-color: #e9e9e9;"| Democratic Primary, September 12, 1978

| colspan="6" style="text-align:center;background-color: #e9e9e9;"| Democratic Primary, September 14, 1982

| colspan="6" style="text-align:center;background-color: #e9e9e9;"| General Election, November 3, 1982

Wisconsin Senate (1984–2000)

Wisconsin Governor (1994)

| colspan="6" style="text-align:center;background-color: #e9e9e9;"| General Election, November 8, 1994

References

External links

1954 births
Living people
People from Merrill, Wisconsin
Wisconsin lawyers
University of Wisconsin–Madison alumni
University of Wisconsin Law School alumni
School board members in Wisconsin
Democratic Party Wisconsin state senators
Wisconsin politicians convicted of crimes
21st-century American politicians
Democratic Party members of the Wisconsin State Assembly